Jeremy Michael Hall (born September 11, 1988) is a football manager and former professional player who currently works as assistant coach for Minnesota United FC 2 in the MLS Next Pro. He operated as a midfielder or defender. Born in the mainland United States, he represented the Puerto Rico national team.

Career

College
Before joining the national under-17 residency program, Hall played for local club Hillsborough County United. Hall played college soccer at the University of Maryland, where he won the 2009 NCAA Division I Championship. During his college career Hall was a two-time NSCAA/Adidas All-American, a USYSA All-American in 2005, and a two-time Parade All-American. In three years at Maryland, he appeared in 66 games, scoring 26 goals and assisting on 14.

Professional
Hall was drafted in the first round (11th overall) of the 2009 MLS SuperDraft by the New York Red Bulls. He made his MLS debut on 19 March 2009, in the 2009 season opener against Seattle Sounders FC. During his first season with New York, Hall appeared in 24 regular season matches playing primarily as a right back. At the conclusion of his first season with New York, Hall went on to train with sister club Red Bull Salzburg.

On 20 March 2010, Hall started and played the full 90 minutes for Red Bulls in a 3–1 victory against Santos FC, which was the first match played at the new Red Bull Arena. On May 23, 2010 Hall scored New York's opening goal in a 3–1 victory over Italian side Juventus FC in a friendly played at Red Bull Arena. On October 21, 2010 Hall started at left back helping New York to a 2–0 victory over New England Revolution which helped New York clinch its second regular season Eastern Conference title.

It was announced on November 22, 2010 that Hall had been traded to 2011 expansion team Portland Timbers in exchange for a 3rd round pick in the 2011 SuperDraft. Hall was a regular starter for Portland before being traded to FC Dallas on August 19, 2011 in exchange for midfielder Eric Alexander.

Hall was traded to Toronto FC on November 29, 2011 in exchange for a second round pick in the 2013 MLS SuperDraft. Hall made his debut as a second half sub for Torsten Frings in a 2–0 home defeat to D.C. United. Hall scored his first professional goal on June 20, 2012 against Houston Dynamo, the game ended in a 3–3 away draw.

In December 2014, Hall was traded by Toronto to New England Revolution in exchange for a fourth-round pick in the 2015 MLS SuperDraft. Hall made 12 appearances for New England in 2015, logging 998 minutes.

On February 8, 2016, it was announced the Hall had signed one-year contract through the 2016 NASL season with his hometown Tampa Bay Rowdies. The contract has a club option for the 2017 season as well. On July 21, 2016, Hall joined United Soccer League side Sacramento Republic on loan.

On July 31, 2021, ahead of 1812 FC Barrie's inaugural match, Hall was announced as the League1 Ontario club's first signing.

International
He has been a member of the U.S. Soccer Residency program since 2003, and has earned 22 caps with the U-17 team, including games at the 2005 FIFA U-17 World Championship in Peru, where he made six starts and scored one goal against the Ivory Coast U-17's. He has also represented the United States at the U-20 level.

In May 2016, Hall was called up to the Puerto Rico national football team for a friendly against the United States in Bayamón, Puerto Rico. Hall qualified to play for the Puerto Rican team by way of his Puerto Rican grandparents. He played the second round of the 2017 Caribbean Cup helping Puerto Rico reach the third round and being only two games away from reaching the 2017 CONCACAF Gold Cup for the first time.

He continued to play with the team in matches against Orlando City SC in 2017 and the CONCACAF Nations League until 2018.

Career statistics

Honors

University of Maryland
NCAA Men's Division I Soccer Championship (1): 2008

Toronto FC
Canadian Championship (1): 2012

References

External links
 
 Maryland bio
 

1988 births
Living people
American sportspeople of Puerto Rican descent
Soccer players from Florida
African-American soccer players
American soccer players
Puerto Rican footballers
Association football defenders
Association football midfielders
Maryland Terrapins men's soccer players
New York Red Bulls draft picks
New York Red Bulls players
Portland Timbers players
FC Dallas players
Toronto FC players
Wilmington Hammerheads FC players
New England Revolution players
Tampa Bay Rowdies players
Sacramento Republic FC players
Major League Soccer players
USL Championship players
United States men's youth international soccer players
Puerto Rico international footballers
Footballers at the 2007 Pan American Games
American expatriate soccer players
Puerto Rican expatriate footballers
American expatriate sportspeople in Canada
Puerto Rican expatriate sportspeople in Canada
Expatriate soccer players in Canada
Pan American Games competitors for Puerto Rico
1812 FC Barrie players